Peter Dodds may refer to:
 Peter Dodds (cricketer)
 Peter Dodds (mathematician)